Spezand Junction Railway Station (Balochi: سپیزنڈ جوڑ اسٹیشن ) is located in Spezand town, Mastung District of Balochistan province of the Pakistan.

See also
 List of railway stations in Pakistan
 Pakistan Railways

References

Railway stations in Mastung District
Railway stations on Quetta–Taftan Railway Line
Railway stations on Rohri–Chaman Railway Line
Railway stations in Balochistan, Pakistan